Richard Sammons (born May 18, 1961, in Columbus, Ohio) is an architect, architectural theorist, visiting professor, and chief designer of Fairfax & Sammons Architects with offices in New York City, New York and Palm Beach, Florida. The firm has an international practice specializing in classical and traditional architecture, interior design and urban planning. Sammons was instrumental in the reemergence of classical design as a major movement in America through his designs as well as his work as an instructor at the Prince of Wales Institute in Britain in 1992-3 and as a founding member of the Institute of Classical Architecture in 1991. From 1996 to 2004, the Fairfax & Sammons office also served as the headquarters for the noted American architecture critic Henry Hope Reed Jr. (1915) and Classical America, the organization he founded in 1968. In 2013, Fairfax & Sammons received the Arthur Ross Award for Lifetime Achievement in Architecture, an award created to recognize and celebrate excellence in the classical tradition.

Early life and education 
Sammons was born in Columbus, Ohio and received his bachelor's degree from Denison University in Granville, Ohio in 1983. His duel interests in Physics and Art, and his undergraduate degree in Studio Art, presaged the later intense focus upon proportion that became a significant hallmark of his design work. He received his Master of Architecture degree at the University of Virginia in 1986. His interest in classical design found support in this period of university education due to the leadership of Dean Jaquelin T. Robertson whose own work and background made him sympathetic to classicism. Sammons also developed a breadth of knowledge through his work as a teaching assistant to the internationally recognized architectural historian and Jefferson scholar, Dr. Frederick Doveton Nichols (1911-1995). Because the faculty of the University of Virginia School of Architecture focused primarily on modernism, Sammons looked to Thomas Jefferson as one of his principal instructors.

Career 
Sammons served his internship in the Manhattan office of David Anthony Easton, a classicist specializing in residential design. At Easton's office, Sammons learned detailing from Joe Marino, an architect who acquired his practical training in the Manhattan firms of Cross and Cross, and later Egerton Swartwout  and  Philip Goodwin. In 1992 Sammons established the firm of Richard Sammons Architect in New York City, New York. In 1997 Sammons and his wife Anne Fairfax renamed the firm Fairfax & Sammons Architects, PC. The firm has a second office in Palm Beach, Florida opened in 1998.  Sammons is a registered architect in New York, Virginia, Connecticut, Ohio, Florida, Georgia, North Carolina, and South Carolina.

In addition to architectural practice, Sammons has taught classes (on architectural design and proportion) at the University of Notre Dame in Rome (Fall 2008); the Georgia Institute of Technology as the Harrison Design Associates Visiting Scholar (Fall 2005); as an instructor, The Prince of Wales Institute of Architecture London, England and the American Summer School (1993 – 1996); and Adjunct Professor of Architecture, Pratt Institute School of Architecture (1987 – 1996). Sammons also served as Associate Director, The Institute of Classical Architecture and The New York Academy of Art from 1993 to 1996.

Sammons was a founder of The Institute of Classical Architecture & Classical America.  He has served as a board member of The Institute of Classical Architecture & Classical America; The Royal Oak Foundation; The Historic House Trust of New York City; The Sir John Soane's Museum Foundation; The Merchants House Museum, New York and he is a Guild Member of The New Urban Guild, a member of the INTBAU College of Traditional Practitioners (ICTP) and a Brother of The Art Workers Guild in London.

Geometric proportioning in practice: examples from the work of Fairfax and Sammons

Awards

Projects 
Richard Sammons' projects include the following:

(For images and a description of each project refer to the firm's website: https://fairfaxandsammons.com/portfolio/)

Town 
 Renovations to an Upper West Side Apartment, New York
 Renovation of a Greenwich Village Townhouse, New York
 Carriage House & Studio, Greenwich Village, New York
 Upper East Side Apartment, New York
 Upper East Side Townhouse, New York
 Upper West Side Artist Residence, New York
 Rustic French Maisonette, Greenwich Village
 Breakers Row Apartment, Palm Beach
 Central Park South Apartment, New York
 Park Avenue Residence, New York
 Central Park West Apartment at The Prasada, New York
 Italianate Townhouse, Greenwich Village, New York

Country 
 Gothic Revival Restoration, Bedford, New York
 New Federal House, Cooperstown, New York
 New Palladian Villa, The Peak, Hong Kong
 New Georgian Residence, Washington, Connecticut
 English Arts & Crafts, Lake Waccabuc, New York
 Georgian Revival Addition, Lexington, Kentucky
 New Jeffersonian Residence, Southport, Connecticut
 Arts & Crafts Stone Cottage, Snedens Landing, New York
 Georgian Arts & Crafts, Greenwich, Connecticut
 Shingle Style Restoration, Greenwich, Connecticut
 House in Caesarea, Israel

Seaside 
 Il Cortile, A New House in Palm Beach, Florida
 New House in Lost Tree Village, Palm Beach, Florida
 New British Colonial, Jupiter, Florida
 Regency House Renovation, Palm Beach, Florida
 New House and Outbuildings on Gin Lane, Southampton, NY
 New House in the Hamptons, Southampton, NY
 The Restoration and Addition to an Anglo-Caribbean House, Palm Beach, Florida
 New Anglo-Caribbean, Gulfstream, Florida
 Renaissance Revival Estate, Palm Beach, Florida
 Setai Penthouse, Miami, Florida

Neighborhood 
 New Townhouses in Brooklyn, NY
 New Urban Marina, Albany, Bahamas
 University in Andorra, Spain
 The Crescent, Poundbury, Dorset, England
 New Urban Project, I'On Development, Mount Pleasant, South Carolina
 Urban Design, Charleston, South Carolina

Books 
 American Houses - The Architecture of Fairfax & Sammons; Mary Miers (Author); Adele Chatfield-Taylor (Introduction); Rizzoli International Publications (November 2006); 
 Classical Architecture For The 21st Century; Francois Gabriel (Author); W. W. Norton & Company (April 2005); 
 The Colonial Revival House; Richard Guy Wilson (Author); Harry N. Abrams (December 2004); 
 Get Your House Right: Architectural Elements to Use & Avoid; Marianne Cusato (Author), Ben Pentreath (Author), Leon Krier (Author), Richard Sammons (Author);  H.R.H. The Prince of Wales (foreword); Sterling (January 1, 2008); 
 Learning From Palladio; Branko Mitrovic (Author); W. W. Norton & Company (May 2004); 
 New Classicism: The Rebirth of Traditional Architecture; Elizabeth M. Dowling (Author); Rizzoli (October 29, 2004); 
 New Compact House Designs; Don Metz (Author); Storey Publishing, LLC (January 8, 1991); 
 New Palladians: Modernity and Sustainability for 21st Century Architecture; Alireza Sagharchi (Author), Lucien Steil (Author); Artmedia Press (May 31, 2010); 
 Big Book of Small House Designs; Dom Metz (Author), Catherine Tredway (Author), Kenneth Tremblay (Author), Lawrence Von Bamford (Author); Black Dog & Leventhal Publishers Inc (September 16, 2004); 
 The Elements of Classical Architecture (Classical America Series in Art and Architecture); Georges Gromort (Author); Richard Sammons (Introductory Essay); W. W. Norton & Co. (June 20, 2001); 
 Theory of Mouldings (Classical America Series in Art and Architecture); C Howard Walker (Author); Richard Sammons (Foreword); W. W. Norton & Co. (July 31, 2007); 
 The Future of the Past: A Conservation Ethic for Architecture, Urbanism, and Historic Preservation; Steven Semes (Author); W. W. Norton & Company (November 9, 2009); 
 The Venice Charter Revisited: Modernism, Conservation and Tradition in the 21st Century; HRH The Prince of Wales (Foreword, Author), Robert Adam (Author), Steven Semes (Author), A. G. K. Menon (Author), Samir Younés (Author), Susan Parham (Author), Gabriele Tagliaventi (Author), Paolo Marconi (Author), Matthew Hardy (Editor); Cambridge Scholars Publishing (November 1, 2009);

Press 
 Spanish Colonial Revival Restoration; Traditional Building June 2020
 Decorating Legend François Catroux Breathes New Life Into Crown Princess Marie-Chantal's Manhattan Townhome; Architectural Digest August 2019
 Inside Liv Tyler's Dreamy West Village Townhouse; Architectural Digest; August 2019
 At Hotel Bennett, a Midcentury Library Becomes an Historically Minded Hotel; Architectural Digest; January 2019
  A Classic Georgian Home with a Modernist Twist in Palm Beach; Architectural Digest; May 2017
 The Reader's Room, Gainsborough Studios; New York Spaces; April 2012
 Size Effects - Renovation of Carriage Houses in New York City; House & Garden; June 2014
 Master Architects; Palm Beach Society Magazine; Sept. - Oct. 2009
 Rooms - Stay Awhile; Palm Beach Illustrated; Habitat; March 2009
 Above the Fray by Gregory Cerio; Elle Decor; January 2009
 Side-by-Side by Kimberly Goad; Southern Accents Magazine; January 2009
 Tradition and Innovation by Erika Alexia Tsoukanelis; Fairfield County Homes; January 2009
 A Foundation in the Classics by Richard S. Chang; The New York Times; February 3, 2008
 Married Architects Reinterpret Classicism in Palm Beach by Jami Supsic; Palm Beach Cottages & Gardens; March 2008
 The Transformers by Mitchell Owens; Elle Decor; December 2007
 Positively West Fourth Street: Cozy Architect Couple Says Pshaw to Postmodernism by Toni Schlesinger; New York Observer; September 25, 2007
 Anne Fairfax & Richard Sammons House Profile; New York Social Diary; August 17, 2007
 Even a Master Needs Help Sometimes; The New York Times; Real Estate Sketch Pad - Bernards Township, N.J; August 5, 2007
 Residential Splendor Book Review by Eve M. Kahn; Period Homes; March, 2007
 Art Above and Below, With Life in the Middle by Fred A. Bernstein; The New York Times; January 4, 2007
 The Anatomy of the Georgian Room by Richard Sammons; Period Homes; March 2006
 Mid-18th-Century Modern: The Classicists Strike Back by David Colman; The New York Times; February 10, 2005
 Reimagining the Far West Side by Alexander Stoddart, Thomas Gordon Smith, John Simpson, Richard Sammons, Peter Pennoyer, Franck Lohsen McCrery, Robert Adam; City Journal; Autumm 2004
 Britain Can Build It; Country Life; October 28, 2004
 The Vision for Marion Square by Jack Simmons; The Charleston City Guardian; December 2003
 Great American Home Award Winner - Old House Journal; Old House Journal; December, 2003
 Group Proposes Plan to Change the Look of Marion Square by Robert Behre; The Charleston Post & Courier; November 27, 2003
 Lyrical Compositions; Period Homes; Volume 4 Number 1; Spring 2003
 Perfect Proportions by Nancy Staab; Southern Accents Magazine; May 2003
 A Decade of Classical Design; The Prince's Foundation Alumni Newsletter; No. 4; Summer 2002
 New England's Home of the Brave; Country Life;  October 11, 2001
 The College of Charleston Library; The Charleston City Guardian; Volume 3, Issue 2; April 2000
 Classic Ideals by Robert J. Hughes; The Wall Street Journal; House of the Week; March 10, 2000
 On The Waterfront'' by Steven M. I.Aroson; Architectural Digest; 1998

References

External links 
 Fairfax and Sammons Architects
 The Royal Oak Foundation
 INTBAU - International Network for Traditional Building, Architecture and Urbanism
 INTBAU College of Traditional Practitioners - ICTP
 Historic House Trust of New York City
 Sir John Soane's Museum
 Merchant's House Museum
 The New Urban Guild
 The Art Workers Guild

American neoclassical architects
New Classical architects
21st-century American architects
20th-century American architects
Architects from New York City
Architects from Florida
1961 births
Living people
Denison University alumni
University of Virginia School of Architecture alumni